The 2022–23 SPHL season is the 19th season of the Southern Professional Hockey League (SPHL).

League business
The same 11 teams from the 2021–22 season returned. The Vermilion County Bobcats officially ceased operations on February 9, 2023.

Regular season

Standings
As of March 12, 2023.

 indicates team has clinched William B. Coffey Trophy (regular season champion) and a playoff spot
 indicates team has clinched a playoff spot
 indicates team has been eliminated from playoff contention

Statistical leaders

Leading skaters 
The following players are sorted by points, then goals. Updated as of March 12, 2023.

GP = Games played; G = Goals; A = Assists; Pts = Points; PIM = Penalty minutes

Leading goaltenders 
The following goaltenders with a minimum 1,320 minutes played lead the league in goals against average. Updated as of March 12, 2023.

GP = Games played; TOI = Time on ice (in minutes); SA = Shots against; GA = Goals against; SO = Shutouts; GAA = Goals against average; SV% = Save percentage; W = Wins; L = Losses; OT = Overtime/shootout loss

References

External links
Southern Professional Hockey League website

Southern Professional Hockey League seasons
SPHL